Orthotrichum scanicum is a species of moss in the Orthotrichaceae family. It is found in Austria, the Czech Republic, China, Denmark, France, Germany, Greece, Hungary, Italy, Norway, Poland, Russia, Serbia and Montenegro, Sweden, and Switzerland. Its natural habitat is temperate forests. It is threatened by habitat loss.

O. scanicum was first found in China in 2010 by a researcher names M. Sulayman. He found this moss on Anshan Mountain which is part of an autonomous region of China. Between the years 2010 and 2015, the species were recorded to be found in 11 additional locations in or near this region.

Sources
 

Orthotrichales
Vulnerable plants
Taxonomy articles created by Polbot